Jacynthe Poirier (born 4 July 1962) is a Canadian fencer. She competed in the women's individual and team foil events at the 1984 and 1988 Summer Olympics.

References

External links
 

1962 births
Living people
Canadian female fencers
Olympic fencers of Canada
Fencers at the 1984 Summer Olympics
Fencers at the 1988 Summer Olympics
People from Gaspésie–Îles-de-la-Madeleine
Sportspeople from Quebec
Pan American Games medalists in fencing
Pan American Games silver medalists for Canada
Fencers at the 1979 Pan American Games